Bătrâna is a commune in Hunedoara County, Transylvania, Romania. It is composed of four villages: Bătrâna, Fața Roșie, Piatra, and Răchițaua.

As per the 2022 census, the commune had 88 inhabitants, making it the smallest Romanian commune in terms of population.

References

Communes in Hunedoara County
Localities in Transylvania